Hobart Henley (born Hess Manassah Henle; November 23, 1887 – May 22, 1964) was an American silent film actor, director, screenwriter and producer. He was involved in over 60 films either as an actor or director or both in his twenty-year career, between 1914 and 1934 when he retired from filmmaking.

Early life

Henley was born Hess Manassah Henle in Louisville, Kentucky, to Samuel Henle, a German immigrant and retailer, and his wife Clementine. His father moved the family to Cincinnati, Ohio, where Henley later attended and graduated from the University of Cincinnati.

Career

Henley began his career as a stage actor, then moved to acting in silent films. He began dual duties of directing and acting in such films as The Gay Old Dog for Pathé in 1919. He continued directing films, many of which were star's debuts like Bette Davis in the Bad Sister (1931) with Humphrey Bogart, as well as those of Reginald Denny, Jimmy Durante, and Will Rogers.

He started his own production company and later worked for Metro-Goldwyn-Mayer, Warner Brothers, Paramount Pictures and Universal Pictures. He directed top stars, including Claudette Colbert, Joan Crawford, Norma Shearer, and Maurice Chevalier. He retired in 1936.

Personal life
He was married twice, first in 1920 to Corinne Barker, and later he married Louisiana native Dorothy March. The latter marriage produced two sons, David, and Hobart Jr. (deceased age 14). Henley died in Beverly Hills, California, aged 76, and is interred at Chapel of the Pines Crematory, Los Angeles.

Partial filmography

 Graft (1915)
 The Double Room Mystery (1917)
 All Woman (1918)
 Laughing Bill Hyde (1918)
 The Face in the Dark (1918)
 The Glorious Adventure (1918)
 The Woman on the Index (1919)
 One Week of Life (1919)
The Gay Old Dog (1919)
 The Peace of Roaring River (1919)
 The Sin That Was His (1920)
 Society Snobs (1921)
 Cheated Hearts (1921)
 Her Night of Nights (1922)
 The Scrapper (1922)
 The Flame of Life (1923)
 The Flirt (1922)
 The Thrill Chaser (1923)
 The Abysmal Brute (1923)
 A Lady of Quality (1924)
 Sinners in Silk (1924)
 The Turmoil (1924)
 Married Flirts (1924)
 So This Is Marriage? (1924)
 The Denial (1925)
 A Slave of Fashion (1925)
 Exchange of Wives (1925)
 His Secretary (1925)
 The Auction Block (1926)
 Tillie the Toiler (1927)
 Wickedness Preferred (1928)
 A Certain Young Man (1928)
 His Tiger Lady (1928)
 The Lady Lies (1929)
 Roadhouse Nights (1930)
 The Big Pond (1930)
 Mothers Cry (1930)
 Free Love (1930)
 Captain Applejack (1931)
 Bad Sister (1931)
 Expensive Women (1931)
 Night World (1932)
Unknown Blonde (1934)

References

External links

 The New York Times Movies

1887 births
1964 deaths
American people of German descent
American male film actors
Film directors from Kentucky
American male screenwriters
American male silent film actors
Male actors from Louisville, Kentucky
20th-century American male actors
Burials at Chapel of the Pines Crematory
Screenwriters from Kentucky
20th-century American male writers
20th-century American screenwriters